Sheyenne River Bridge may refer to:

Colton's Crossing Bridge, near Lisbon, North Dakota, NRHP-listed
Lisbon Bridge (Lisbon, North Dakota), also NRHP-listed

See also
 Sheyenne River, North Dakota, USA; a river that is a tributary to the Red River
 DSD Bridge over Cheyenne River, Niobrara County, Wyoming, USA
 Sheyenne (disambiguation)